Roberto Soriano (born 8 February 1991) is an Italian professional footballer who plays as a midfielder for Serie A club Bologna. Born in Germany, he plays for the Italy national team.

Club career

Early career
Soriano was born in the German city of Darmstadt to a family from Sperone, Province of Avellino, Italy. He started his career with Bayern Munich after being spotted by their scouts in the 2007 Champions Youth Cup while playing for Die Roten.

Sampdoria
On 2 February 2009, Soriano moved to Italian club Sampdoria for an undisclosed fee. Soriano immediately entered Sampdoria's Primavera, or youth team, for the 2009 Torneo di Viareggio, where the Genoa based club finished as runners-up. In the 2009–10 season, Sampdoria were eliminated in the semi-finals at the Campionato Nazionale Primavera, in which Soriano played.

Empoli
In June 2010, he was loaned to Serie B side Empoli. Soriano made his club debut on 15 August 2010 in a friendly against Reggiana. Soriano was substituted by Gianluca Musacci during the second half. Empoli went on to win that match 4–1. He made his Serie B debut in Empoli's first Serie B match of the season as a defensive/holding midfielder along with Davide Moro. He was substituted for Mirko Valdifiori in the 66th minute. Empoli drew that game 1–1 against Frosinone. However, Empoli would win the away match 3–2. Soriano started from the bench in the next match, losing his starting spot to Gianluca Musacci. He returned to the starting XI in Empoli's 5th Serie B game of the season, and played as a central/defensive midfielder, a position he would be utilized in during the next 2 rounds (4–4–2 formation and 4–3–1–2 formation). On 11 December, he scored his first Serie B goal in the game against Portogruaro.

On 31 August 2015, Soriano signed a contract with Napoli worth €13.5m with Juan Camilo Zúñiga set to join Sampdoria as part of the deal, but the transfer fell through because Napoli did not deposit the contract with Lega Serie A before the 23:00 deadline. It is believed the delay was mainly due to disputes about image rights.

Villarreal
On 2 August 2016, Spanish club Villarreal CF and Sampdoria reached an agreement for the transfer of Soriano. He signed a five-year contract, for a reported fee of €14 million. Soriano made his club debut in a 1–1 away draw against Granada in La Liga, on 20 August.

Torino (loan)
On 17 August 2018, he joined Italian club Torino on loan with an option to buy.

Bologna (loan)
On 4 January 2019, he joined Italian club Bologna on loan with an option to buy.

International career

Youth team
Soriano played all three matches in the 2008 UEFA European Under-17 Football Championship elite round. He also received a call-up to the 2008 Minsk under-17 International Tournament. He scored a goal in the third place match. Soriano was to receive a call-up from the Italian under-19 side for the game against Romania in December 2008. He was included in Italy's starting line-up for this match. The game finished 3–1 to Italy. Soriano received a call-up to all upcoming U18/19 matches, played in the friendly against Norway in March, was an unused substitute against Ukraine (born 1990 class) in April and also appeared in an U18 international tournament in Slovakia. In August 2009, he was promoted to the U21 team aged , for the match against Wales. Coach Pierluigi Casiraghi called-up 6 new players in for that match, only Mattia Perin (born in November 1992) and Lorenzo Crisetig (born in January 1993) were  younger than Soriano. He made his debut in the first match of U21 qualification, a 1–2 loss to Wales on 4 September 2009. Soriano was also involved in two of Italy's qualification matches in September and October. On 17 November, he opened the scoring for Italy in a 0–4 victory away against Luxembourg. In January 2010, Soriano returned to the U19 team and played in the elite qualification round and in the final of the tournament. On 3 September 2010, he returned to the U21 team and scored the winning goal for Azzurrini in the second last qualifying match. Italy must win the last 2 matches and depends the result of Wales versus Hungary (which Hungary lost eventually, certainly finished second or below). Soriano played the last match of the qualifying, substituted Marrone in the 56th minute. Italy beat Wales 1–0 and finished ahead Wales as the first of Group 3, qualifying directly to play-offs round while Wales were eliminated.

In the play-offs round, he received the call-up but failed to enter the line-up nor on the bench in the first leg.

Senior team
On 9 November 2014, he was called up by Antonio Conte to the senior Italy squad ahead of a UEFA Euro 2016 qualifying match against Croatia and a friendly against Albania. He debuted against Croatia at the San Siro on the 16th, replacing Manuel Pasqual in the 28th minute of a 1–1 draw.

Career statistics

Club

International

References

External links
 
 
 FIGC National Team data 

Italian footballers
Italy youth international footballers
Italy under-21 international footballers
Italy international footballers
German footballers
German expatriate sportspeople in Spain
Italian expatriate footballers
Italian expatriate sportspeople in Spain
Expatriate footballers in Spain
Serie A players
Serie B players
La Liga players
FC Bayern Munich II players
U.C. Sampdoria players
Empoli F.C. players
Villarreal CF players
Torino F.C. players
Bologna F.C. 1909 players
Association football midfielders
German people of Italian descent
People of Campanian descent
Sportspeople from Darmstadt
People from Avellino
1991 births
Living people
Footballers from Hesse
Footballers from Campania
Sportspeople from the Province of Avellino